River's Edge is a 1986 American crime drama film directed by Tim Hunter, written by Neal Jimenez, and starring Crispin Glover, Keanu Reeves, Ione Skye Leitch, Daniel Roebuck and Dennis Hopper. It follows a group of teenagers in a Northern California town who are forced to deal with their friend's murder of his girlfriend and the subsequent disposal of her body. Jimenez partially based the script on the 1981 murder of Marcy Renee Conrad in Milpitas, California.

Shot in Los Angeles in 1986, the film premiered that year at the Toronto International Film Festival before Island Pictures purchased it for distribution, theatrically releasing it in the United States in May 1987. Several critics praised the film's performances, and its subject matter resulted in several critics classifying it as a contemporary horror film. It was awarded Best Picture at the 1986 Independent Spirit Awards.

Contemporary film scholars have noted River's Edge as an example of the "killer kid" film, as well as one of the most polarizing youth-oriented films of the 1980s. In a 2015 retrospective, Salon deemed it "the darkest teen film of all time." The film has an original score by Jürgen Knieper, as well as a soundtrack featuring songs from various punk and metal bands, including Slayer, Fates Warning, Agent Orange, and the Wipers.

Plot 
In Northern California, as pre-teen Tim throws his sister's doll into a river, he sees a teenager, John, smoking on the other side, next to the naked corpse of his girlfriend Jamie. Shortly after, Tim is playing an arcade game at a convenience store where he sees John being refused the sale of beer. While John is arguing with the Cashier, Tim steals two cans of beer. John leaves the store and when he goes to start his car he notices Tim has placed the beer cans on his front seat. Tim accompanies John on a trip to meet Feck to purchase cannabis. Tim returns home, where his older brother Matt and mother are searching for the doll. Matt's friend Layne arrives, and the two drive to meet Feck, a neurotic ex-biker and drug dealer, for marijuana. On the way, Layne recounts a party from the night before, where John and Jamie were arguing.

At school, Layne and Matt smoke with their friends Clarissa, Maggie, and Tony. Matt talks about wanting to run away to Portland, which Clarissa dismisses. John arrives and says he killed Jamie. Clarissa and Maggie leave for class, thinking he's joking. John brings Layne and Matt to see Jamie's body; Matt is disturbed, while Layne is focused on covering up the crime.

The group go see Jamie's body, with Layne's older brother Mike driving them there in his truck. Later, Clarissa calls Matt, but he is reluctant to talk to her. Meanwhile, Layne returns to the scene and pushes Jamie's body into the river. After noticing police cars near John's house, they drive to Feck's house, where John stays to hide out. Matt directs the police to the river, where they find Jamie's body. The police interrogate him, threatening to charge him as an accessory after the fact. Matt returns home and argues with his mother and her boyfriend. When he sees that Tim has defaced the grave marker for her lost doll that their sister made, Matt hits Tim in the face. Tim goes to his friend Moko's house and they go to Feck's to obtain a gun.

In the middle of the night, Layne, Clarissa and Matt drive to Tony's house, but Tony's father chases them off with a shotgun. Layne argues with Clarissa and kicks her out of his car. Matt gets out and walks with her. They stop at a convenience store and run into John and Feck. Tim and Moko break into Feck's house looking for a gun, but instead find his marijuana, which they use to get stoned and pass out. Matt and Clarissa talk in the park, where they discuss their conflicting feelings of grief and apathy over Jamie's murder. John and Feck go to the river's edge to drink, with Feck bringing along his blow-up doll, Ellie. Feck confesses to murdering his own girlfriend years earlier, despite having deeply loved her. John drunkenly brags about killing Jamie, recounting his strangling of her with a relish that disturbs Feck. Matt and Clarissa have sex in the park nearby, then fall asleep. Layne drives around town in a panic, compulsively taking pills.

At dawn, after John falls asleep on the riverbank, Feck shoots him in the head. He returns home, where Tim and Moko knock him out and steal his gun. The police find Layne and bring him in for questioning. At school, reporters interview Maggie and Tony, who seem dispassionate. The police arrest Feck in his house. The teenagers go to the river together. Matt admits to Layne he told the police that John murdered Jamie. Layne runs off and finds John's body. Tim arrives and points Feck's gun at Matt, threatening to kill Matt for hitting him the night before, but Matt dissuades him.

The police arrive and escort the teenagers and Tim away. In the hospital, Feck admits to killing John "because there was no hope for him," and confesses to murdering his girlfriend. Matt, Clarissa, Tony, and Maggie attend Jamie's funeral, where they show emotion at seeing her for the last time.

Cast

Themes
Film scholar Emanuel Levy writes that the film "addresses the alienation and moral vacancy among American kids growing up in a drug-oriented, valueless culture. River's Edge has the disturbing quality of a collective fear—the cherished, eagerly awaited adolescence is presented as confusing and vacuous. Unlike most 1980s teenage sex comedies, this film doesn't glamorize youth, instead depicting it as a bleak, aimless coming of age, a time of boredom, stupor, and waste." But Levy writes that the film does share with its peers the manner in which it presents adult figures as "irresponsible and indifferent."

Production

Conception
While the screenplay is fiction, it draws from the November 3, 1981, murder of Marcy Renee Conrad, who was raped and strangled by Anthony Jacques Broussard in Milpitas, California. Broussard bragged about the crime, showing the body to at least 13 different people; despite this, the crime went unreported for two days. Screenwriter Neal Jimenez was taking screenwriting courses at the University of California, Los Angeles at the time of Conrad's murder, and said he based the script partially on the event. He said, "the incident is merely the inspiration for the screenplay." Others have noticed similarities between the film and the 1984 murder of Gary Lauwers by his friend Ricky Kasso.

Hemdale Film Corporation expressed interest in Jimenez's script, and agreed to distribute the film with Tim Hunter directing. Producer Midge Sanford recalled: "Hemdale were a small company that made some very good movies, like Salvador and Hoosiers. They really responded to the script and said they would finance it with Tim as the director." The film was in pre-production for four months, with a final budget of $1.7 million.

Casting
River's Edge was the first major film for many of its actors, including Roebuck and Skye. Of casting Reeves, casting director Carrie Frazier recalled: "He walked in the door, and I went, 'Oh my god, this is my guy!' It was just because of the way he held his body—his shoes were untied, and what he was wearing looked like a young person growing into being a man. I was over the moon about him." Skye was cast in the film after a casting director saw a photo of her with her brother, Donovan Leitch, an aspiring actor at the time; she had no acting experience, and it was her first film. Auditioning for the role of the brutish John, Roebuck arrived at his audition in full costume, with his hair slicked back with K-Y Jelly and two beer cans in his front pockets. The casting director saw Danyi Deats in the waiting room, while she was waiting for her best friend who was auditioning for the same role.

For the part of Feck, director Hunter had wanted John Lithgow; the part was also offered to Harry Dean Stanton, who declined, and passed the script on to his friend Dennis Hopper, who was cast. Sanford recalled Glover had auditioned "with a wig and an outrageous take on the part. He was so out there that Sarah and I were a little nervous about what he was doing. But we trusted him and felt like it would work out in the end." Corey Haim was cast as Tim, but had to be replaced by Joshua John Miller after developing pneumonia during the first several days of filming.

Filming
Hunter originally wanted to shoot the film in Los Angeles, but instead opted to shoot near Sacramento because it had natural locations more conducive to the screenplay. The crew arrived to shoot scenes along the American River, but were forced to leave due to a major flood. Hunter settled on shooting the film in Sunland-Tujunga, Los Angeles, a community in the foothills above Burbank. Filming took place from January to March 1986. Hunter said, "It was an area where people with tuberculosis could come to sanatoriums for the clean air. By the time we shot River's Edge, it had become a smog pocket—but it was full of river rock houses that gave it a 'land that time forgot' feeling."

Release
The film premiered at the Toronto International Film Festival on September 10, 1986. Producer Midge Sanford recalled the screening leaving the audience divided: "Some executives from a small distribution company wouldn't look at us [after a festival screening]. People either embraced it or were very put off by it. It didn't get picked up right away." The film was ultimately purchased for distribution by Island Pictures, which released it in the U.S. on May 8, 1987.

Critical reception 
River's Edge received largely positive reviews from critics. It holds an 88% approval rating on Rotten Tomatoes based on 42 reviews with the consensus: "A harrowing tale of aimless youth, River's Edge generates considerable tension and urgency thanks to strong performances from a stellar cast including Crispin Glover, Keanu Reeves and Ione Skye." Metacritic gave the film a score of 73 based on 19 reviews, indicating "generally favorable reviews". At the time of its release, several critics considered it a contemporary horror film.

Gene Siskel ranked River's Edge the seventh-best film of 1987, while Roger Ebert awarded the film three-and-a-half out of four stars, calling it "the best analytical film about a crime since The Onion Field and In Cold Blood." Michael Wilmington of the Los Angeles Times called the film "a contemporary horror story about teen-agers, but it contains no slasher scenes or serial homicides. Its monsters are all too real." The New York Timess Janet Maslin called it "bitter and disturbing" and deemed the performances "natural and credible." Vincent Canby, also of The New York Times, named the film "the year's most riveting, most frightening horror film, even if doesn't really belong in the same category with any acknowledged classics of the genre. Metaphysics has nothing to do with River's Edge, though, like Dracula, it's a tale of the undead." David Ansen of Newsweek called the film "the scariest vision of youth since the alarming Brazilian movie Pixote... River's Edge pitches the audience inside this nightmare world of affectless middle-class kids and lets us watch them wallow their way through moral dilemmas they can only half articulate." John Simon of the National Review called River's Edge "splendid".

In a 2015 retrospective, Salon deemed River's Edge "the darkest teen film of all time." Film historian Kim Newman named the film "the definitive killer kid movie... Moral without moralizing, blackly comic without tastelessness, [and] acutely tuned in to the way dead-end teens talk."

Soundtrack 
The film's soundtrack, released in 1987 by Enigma Records, features various thrash metal, reggae, and punk tracks.

Home media 
River's Edge was released on VHS in 1987 by Embassy Home Entertainment. On January 23, 2001, a DVD was released by MGM Home Entertainment in its "Avant-Garde Cinema" series. A Blu-ray was released by Kino Lorber on January 13, 2015.

See also 
 List of American films of 1986

References

Works cited

Further reading

External links 

Henry A. Giroux on River's Edge and postmodern education 

1986 films
1986 crime drama films
American crime drama films
American high school films
American independent films
1986 independent films
American teen drama films
Crime films based on actual events
Teen crime films
Films about murder
Films directed by Tim Hunter
Films set in California
Films shot in Los Angeles
Independent Spirit Award for Best Film winners
Films scored by Jürgen Knieper
1980s English-language films
1980s American films